The Simpson Plantation, also known as Liberty Hall, is a historic plantation southeast of Americus, Georgia on South Lee Street. It was added to the National Register of Historic Places on November 25, 1980.

It is notable for its Greek Revival architecture, including its four-column portico. It has a hipped roof. It has a one-story kitchen addition built c.1888.

See also
National Register of Historic Places listings in Sumter County, Georgia

References

Houses in Sumter County, Georgia
Plantations in Georgia (U.S. state)
Houses on the National Register of Historic Places in Georgia (U.S. state)